Dean Oliver Barrow, SC PC (born March 2, 1951) is a politician from Belize who served as prime minister of Belize from 2008 until 2020 and as leader of Belize's United Democratic Party. 

An attorney by profession, Barrow served as Belize's deputy prime minister and minister of foreign affairs from 1993 to 1998 and was Leader of the Opposition from 1998 until the UDP won the February 2008 election. Barrow was elected to his first term as prime minister in 2008. He started his second term after the UDP again won an election on March 7, 2012 and his third term when the UDP won again on November 4,  2015.

Early life and education
Barrow was born and raised in Belize City, British Honduras (now Belize). He attended the University of Miami in Coral Gables, Florida, where he graduated with a degree in economics and political science.

Legal career
Following his graduation from the University of Miami, Barrow returned to Belize, where he entered the legal profession in 1974, working with his maternal uncle Dean Lindo and rising to partner in Lindo's firm in 1977. He eventually left to form his own law firm, Barrow and Williams (with Rodwell Williams). He left the firm in 2008, but maintains the title of senior partner. Among his firms' more controversial clients was Lord Ashcroft and Ashcroft's associated businesses, including Belize Bank and Belize Telemedia Limited (formerly Belize Telecommunications Limited).

Political career

In December 1983, Barrow entered electoral politics as a candidate in Belize City's elections for city council, which he won as part of a nine-man slate. Before that year's redistricting, in 1984 Barrow was preselected as the UDP candidate for Collet but after redistricting chose to contest the newly created Queen's Square constituency instead, as was his prerogative under UDP party rules. In the ensuing election Barrow handily defeated Ralph Fonseca of the People's United Party. Soon after he was appointed to the first Manuel Esquivel Cabinet as Attorney-General and Minister of Foreign Affairs.

In the 1989 general election, Barrow defeated Thomas Greenwood but his party lost the election. Barrow continued in his law practice. In 1990, he became deputy UDP leader under Esquivel after the death of Curl Thompson. In 1993, Barrow won his third straight general election and returned to the Cabinet in the posts he held from the previous administration in addition to Minister of National Security. His detractors called him "Minister of Everything" during this period because he was a particularly high-profile spokesman for the Esquivel government.

After the UDP's devastating 1998 election loss in which he was one of only three UDP winners, Barrow was elevated to UDP party leader and Leader of the Opposition, succeeding the defeated Esquivel. Barrow presided over the smallest oppositions (three and seven respectively) in the House of Representatives since 1974 and ever in the UDP's history. Barrow was reelected in 1998 and 2003 by closer margins than his previous elections over attorney Richard "Dickie" Bradley. He has since been re-elected by comfortable majorities.

Prior to his retirement in 2020, Barrow was the most senior member of the UDP delegation in the Belize House as well as the Area Representative with the longest tenure of uninterrupted service. Among other Area Representatives, only Said Musa has had a longer cumulative time in office.

Prime Minister of Belize

The UDP won a massive victory, with 25 out of 31 seats, in the general election held on 7 February 2008, and Barrow was sworn in as Prime Minister on 8 February. He is the country's first black Prime Minister. He announced his Cabinet, including himself as Minister of Finance, on 11 February.

The UDP won a reduced majority in the 2012 general election and Barrow started his second term as Prime Minister on 9 March 2012. He announced his cabinet, including himself as the Minister of Finance and Economic Development, on 12 March 2012.

Barrow led the UDP to a third consecutive general election victory in November 2015, however he stated the election would be his last as party leader.

Retirement in 2020

Citing health issues, Barrow initially said he would step down as prime minister no later than the end of 2019 and hinted he could do so earlier.

However, on 18 November 2018, Barrow's Cabinet urged him to remain as Prime Minister of Belize until the 2020 Belizean general election. He said that he would take that move.

A convention to name Barrow's successor as UDP party leader was tentatively scheduled for May 2019, but in August 2019, the UDP postponed the date to 9 February 2020.

There were two confirmed candidates for the leadership convention, with the first one being Deputy Prime Minister, Patrick Faber and the other being National Security Minister, John Saldivar.

Barrow also stood down from his House seat in Queen's Square in the 2020 general election, endorsing his sister, Denise "Sister B" Barrow, to succeed him.

Family

Barrow has four children. The oldest, born Jamal Barrow, is a former rapper who performed under the name Shyne. He has since changed his name to Moses Michael Levi Barrow. He was elected to the Belize House of Representatives with the center-right Belize United Democratic Party  in the Belize City-based Mesopotamia constituency in the 2020 Belizean general election. He was subsequently also appointed the Opposition Leader in the House of Representatives and the leader of the Belize United Democratic Party, in both June 2021 (until September 2021) and February 2022. 

His second son Anwar runs a small-scale lending institution. His daughter Deanne practises law out of her mother's (Barrow's first wife Lois Young) firm.

Barrow was married a second time 7 February 2009 in Savannah, Georgia to his long-time girlfriend Kim Simplis. They have one daughter, Salima.

Education

Barrow attended St. Michael's College in Belize and the University of the West Indies at Cave Hill in Barbados (LL.B. 1973); Norman Manley Law School, Mona, Kingston, Jamaica (Certificate of Legal Education, 1975); University of Miami School of Law (LL.M., 1981); University of Miami (M.A. International Relations).

References

|-

|-

1951 births
Living people
People from Belize City
United Democratic Party (Belize) politicians
Prime Ministers of Belize
Deputy Prime Ministers of Belize
Finance ministers of Belize
Foreign ministers of Belize
Attorneys-General of Belize
Members of the Belize House of Representatives for Queen's Square
Members of the Privy Council of the United Kingdom
21st-century heads of government in North America
Belizean lawyers
University of Miami alumni
University of Miami School of Law alumni
People associated with the Norman Manley Law School